is a yaoi manga series by Kai Asou.

Reception
The manga received a positive review by Rebecca Silverman in Anime News Network.

References

External links

2010 manga
Houbunsha manga
Yaoi anime and manga
Digital Manga Publishing titles